Thiamylal (Surital) is a barbiturate derivative invented in the 1950s. It has sedative, anticonvulsant, and hypnotic effects, and is used as a strong but short acting sedative. Thiamylal is still in current use, primarily for induction in surgical anaesthesia or as an anticonvulsant to counteract side effects from other anaesthetics. It is the thiobarbiturate analogue of secobarbital.

References 

Thiobarbiturates
GABAA receptor positive allosteric modulators
Allyl compounds